The 52nd Baeksang Arts Awards ceremony was held on June 3, 2016, at Grand Peace Hall, Kyung Hee University in Seoul. It was broadcast live on JTBC and was hosted by Shin Dong-yup and Bae Suzy. Organised by Ilgan Sports and JTBC Plus, it is South Korea's only awards ceremony which recognises excellence in both film and television.

Winners and nominees 
Winners are listed first and highlighted in boldface.
Nominees

Film

Television

Special awards

References

External links 
  
 

Baeksang
Baeksang
Baeksang Arts Awards
Baek
Baek
2010s in Seoul
2016 in South Korea